George Guthrie Moir MA (30 October 1917 - 29 November 1993), was a British television producer, Liberal Party politician, prominent Christian and writer who was one of the founders of Independent Television.

Background
He was the son of James William and May Flora Moir. He was educated at Berkhamsted School in Hertfordshire and Peterhouse, Cambridge. In 1951 he married Sheila Maureen Ryan, SRN. They had one son and two daughters. One of his daughters was Suzy Moir who married The Reverend Canon David Reindorp.

In 1940 he joined up with the 5th Suffolk Regiment as an officer. In 1942 he became a Prisoner of War in Singapore. He was put to work on the notorious Burma Railway for three and a half years.

Political career
He was a member of the Liberal Party. His first involvement in politics was being elected to Aylesbury Rural District Council in 1947, on which he served for two years. In 1949 he was elected as an Independent to Buckinghamshire County Council on which he served until 1975. He stood as a Liberal candidate at the United Kingdom general election of 1950 in his home constituency of Aylesbury in Buckinghamshire. He finished third and did not stand for parliament again. 

In 1950 he became the Director of the European Youth Campaign. In 1952 he was elected the second ever President of the World Assembly of Youth, serving until 1956.

Professional career
In 1958 he became Assistant Controller and Executive Producer at Rediffusion Television. In 1968 he became head of Education and Religious programmes at Thames Television. (He was a Member of the General Synod of the Church of England, formerly House of Laity, Church Assembly, from 1956–75.)

Publications
(editor) Why I Believe, 1964
(editor) Life’s Work, 1965
(editor) Teaching and Television: ETV Explained, 1967 
(editor) Beyond Hatred, 1969
The Suffolk Regiment, 1969
Into Television, 1969
He wrote contributions for The Times, Times Educational Supplement, Church Times, The Contemporary Review and The Frontier.

See also
World Assembly of Youth
Aylesbury (UK Parliament constituency)

References

1917 births
1993 deaths
Liberal Party (UK) parliamentary candidates
Alumni of Peterhouse, Cambridge
Liberal Party (UK) councillors
British Army personnel of World War II
World War II prisoners of war held by Japan
Suffolk Regiment officers
Independent councillors in the United Kingdom
Councillors in Buckinghamshire
Members of Buckinghamshire County Council
Burma Railway prisoners
Members of the General Synod of the Church of England